In Greek mythology, Acrisius (Ancient Greek: Ἀκρίσιος means 'ill-judgment') was a king of Argos. He was the grandfather of the famous Greek demi-god Perseus.

Family 
Acrisius was the son of Abas and Aglaea (or Ocalea, depending on the author), grandson of Lynceus, great-grandson of Danaus. He was the twin brother of Proetus and the half brother of Lyrcus. Acrisius was father by Eurydice or Aganippe of Danae  and thus grandfather of the hero Perseus through her. His other daughter was Evarete, wife of King Oenomaus of Pisa in Elis.

Mythology

Rivalry of twins 
Acrisius and Proetus were said to have quarrelled even in the womb of their mother and when Abas died and Acrisius had grown up, he expelled Proetus from his inheritance. On his exile, Proetus was supported by his father-in-law Iobates, the Lycian, Proetus returned, and Acrisius was compelled to share his kingdom with his brother by giving Tiryns to him, while he retained Argos for himself.

Death
Disappointed by his lack of luck in having a son, Acrisius consults the Oracle at Delphi, who warns him that he will one day be killed by his daughter Danaë's son. Danaë is childless and to keep her so, he imprisons her in a bronze chamber open to the sky in the courtyard of his palace. Zeus impregnates her in the form of a golden shower (some accounts say it is her uncle, Proetus, who impregnates her). Danaë becomes pregnant with Perseus. Acrisius puts the child and Danaë in a chest and throws it into the sea. Zeus asks Poseidon to calm the water; he does and Danaë and Perseus survive, washing up on the island of Seriphos.  A fisherman named Dictys, brother of King Polydectes, finds the pair and takes care of them.

Perseus grows up to be a hero, killing Medusa and rescuing Andromeda. Perseus and Danaë return to Argos with Andromeda, but King Acrisius has gone to Larissa. When Perseus arrives in Larissa, he participates in funeral games and accidentally strikes Acrisius on the head with a discus, killing him and fulfilling the prophecy.

Founder of Delphic amphictyony
According to the Scholiast on Euripides, Acrisius was the founder of the Delphic amphictyony.  Strabo believes that this amphictyony existed before the time of Acrisius, and that he was only the first who regulated the affairs of the amphictyons, fixed the towns which were to take part in the council, gave to each its vote, and settled the jurisdiction of the amphictyons.

Argive genealogy chart

Notes

References 

 Apollodorus, The Library with an English Translation by Sir James George Frazer, F.B.A., F.R.S. in 2 Volumes, Cambridge, MA, Harvard University Press; London, William Heinemann Ltd. 1921. ISBN 0-674-99135-4. Online version at the Perseus Digital Library. Greek text available from the same website.
Gaius Julius Hyginus, Fabulae from The Myths of Hyginus translated and edited by Mary Grant. University of Kansas Publications in Humanistic Studies. Online version at the Topos Text Project.
Graves, Robert, The Greek Myths, Harmondsworth, London, England, Penguin Books, 1960. 
Graves, Robert, The Greek Myths: The Complete and Definitive Edition. Penguin Books Limited. 2017. 
 Pausanias, Description of Greece with an English Translation by W.H.S. Jones, Litt.D., and H.A. Ormerod, M.A., in 4 Volumes. Cambridge, MA, Harvard University Press; London, William Heinemann Ltd. 1918. Online version at the Perseus Digital Library
 Pausanias, Graeciae Descriptio. 3 vols. Leipzig, Teubner. 1903.  Greek text available at the Perseus Digital Library.
 Strabo, The Geography of Strabo. Edition by H.L. Jones. Cambridge, Mass.: Harvard University Press; London: William Heinemann, Ltd. 1924. Online version at the Perseus Digital Library.
 Strabo, Geographica edited by A. Meineke. Leipzig: Teubner. 1877. Greek text available at the Perseus Digital Library.

Princes in Greek mythology
Abantiades (mythology)
Kings of Argos
Kings in Greek mythology
Argive characters in Greek mythology
Mythology of Argos